Nils Kettner (6 January 1898 – 15 April 1967) was a Swedish equestrian. He competed in two events at the 1928 Summer Olympics.

References

External links
 

1898 births
1967 deaths
Swedish male equestrians
Olympic equestrians of Sweden
Equestrians at the 1928 Summer Olympics
People from Tierp Municipality
Sportspeople from Uppsala County